Shadow of Doubt is a 1935 American mystery film directed by George B. Seitz and written by Wells Root. The film stars Ricardo Cortez as Sim Sturdevant, whose fiance Trenna Plaice (Virginia Bruce) is suspected in the murder of movie producer Len Hayworth (Bradley Page). Sturdevant's aunt (Constance Collier) investigates and identifies the real killer. Based on a story by novelist Arthur Somers Roche, the film was released on February 15, 1935, by Metro-Goldwyn-Mayer.

Plot
Sim Sturdevant visits his aunt Melissa Pilson. Pilson is upset about his affair with actress Trenna Plaice. Pilson thinks Plaice is a social inferior and only after money. Sturdevant says he plans to marry Plaice, and has secured a radio contract for her that will allow her to continue her acting career while living with him in New York. However, Plaice rejects Sturdevant's proposal, saying she has a movie offer and marriage proposal from Len Hayworth. Sturdevant and Plaice argue until Plaice calls Hayworth to accept his proposal. Immediately after Sturdevant leaves, Plaice receives a call back from Lisa Bellwood, who claims she will be marrying Hayworth the next day.

Sturdevant goes to a club, where he offers the radio contract to singer Johnny Johnson. Hayworth and Bellwood also come to the club, which upsets Johnson because Hayworth has made unwanted advances to her. Johnson's boyfriend, press agent Reed Ryan, approaches Sturdevant's table at the same time as Hayworth. Hayworth tells Ryan about Sturdevant's failed proposal, and Sturdevant punches Hayworth in the face.

Hearing a rumor that Hayworth wants revenge for his humiliation, Johnson follows Hayworth home from the club. At the same time, Plaice visits Hayworth's home, where she is admitted by a butler who tells her he needs to go out, but she can wait for Hayworth inside. Bellwood brings home Hayworth, who has passed out drunk, and leaves him on a couch, not realizing that Plaice is in the next room. Soon after, Hayworth's butler returns and finds him dead on the couch from a gunshot wound.

The police suspect Plaice because she admits to being in Hayworth's home. She also previously owned a pistol of the same type used in the murder, although she claims to no longer have it. Plaice tells Sturdevant she went to Hayworth's to turn down his proposal, because she wants to marry Sturdevant instead. Hayworth's butler calls claiming to know who committed the murder. When Plaice goes to meet the butler, he is killed by an unknown shooter, using the same type of gun that killed Hayworth.

When Pilson visits Plaice and sees how distraught she is, Pilson decides she is innocent. Plaice believes the gun she used to own was stolen by her former butler, but Pilson finds the gun in Plaice's apartment. Pilson removes the gun before police can find it. Pilson sets a trap by talking openly about having the gun. She claims to have located the butler who stole it and says he will be coming to testify about who he sold it to. The killer is revealed to be Ryan, who was jealous over Hayworth's advances towards Johnson. As a collector of Hollywood memorabilia, Ryan had previously purchased the stolen gun from Plaice’s butler, and used it to divert suspicion.

Cast 
Ricardo Cortez as Simeon "Sim" Sturdevant
Virginia Bruce as Trenna Plaice
Constance Collier as Melissa Pilson
Isabel Jewell as Inez "Johnny" Johnson
Arthur Byron as Morgan Bellwood
Betty Furness as Lisa Bellwood
Regis Toomey as Reed Ryan
Ivan Simpson as Morse
Bradley Page as Len Hayworth
Edward Brophy as Lieutenant Wilcox
Samuel S. Hinds as Mr. Granby
Richard Tucker as Mark Torrey
Bernard Siegel as Ehrhardt
Paul Hurst as Lieutenant Sackville

Production and release
Arthur Somers Roche wrote the novel Shadow of Doubt in 1934. It was serialized in Collier's starting on October 13, 1934, and concluding on January 5, 1935. Roche sold the movie rights to Metro-Goldwyn-Mayer while the serial was still in galley proofs, and Wells Root was assigned to write the screenplay.

The movie was released on February 15, 1935.

References

External links 
 

1935 films
American mystery films
1935 mystery films
Metro-Goldwyn-Mayer films
Films directed by George B. Seitz
American black-and-white films
1930s English-language films
1930s American films